Jašarević or Jasarevic is a Bosnian surname. It is composed of the masculine Turkish given name and surname Yaşar – the singular, third person conjugation of the Turkish verb yaşamak "to live" and therefore meaning "he/she/it lives" – and the Bosnian patronymic suffix -ević. People with the surname include:
 Ešref Jašarević (born 1951), Yugoslav footballer
 Husein Jašarević (1914–1979), Bosnian footballer
 Irfan Jašarević (born 1995), Bosnian footballer
 Mahir Jasarević (born 1992), Hungarian footballer
 Murat Jašarević (born 1969), former Bosnian footballer
  (born 1955), Bosnian author and journalist

References

Bosnian surnames
Patronymic surnames